The Arboretum de l'Étoile des Andaines (13 hectares) is an arboretum located in Champsecret, Orne, Normandy, France.

History 
The arboretum was created in 1947 by forestry chief Robert Julienne and today contains about 66 types of hardwood trees and conifers with a walking loop of two kilometers in length.

See also 
 List of botanical gardens in France

References 
 BaLaDO.fr entry (French)
 L'Echo des Chênaies entry (French)
 Bagnoles entry (French)

Gardens in Orne
Etoile des Andaines